Domingos Torrado, O.S.A. (1555–1612) was a Roman Catholic prelate who was named as Titular Bishop of Fisicula (1605–1612). He is also known as Domingos Terrado or Domingos da Trinidade.

Biography
Domingos Torrado da Trinidade was born in Elvas, Portugal in 1555 and ordained a priest in the Order of Saint Augustine. 
He served as vicar general of his congregation. 
He traveled to Asia where he founded a convent in Colombo.
On 7 Feb 1605, he was appointed during the papacy of Pope Clement VIII as Titular Bishop of Fiscula and auxiliary Bishop of the Archdiocese of Goa (some sources name him as titular bishop of Salé).
On 13 Apr 1608, he was consecrated bishop by Alexeu de Jesu de Meneses, Archbishop of Goa.
In 1610, de Meneses returned to Europe and Torrado served as administrator of the Archdiocese. 
On 21 January 1612, Pope Paul V separated the east coast of Africa (from the Cape of Guardafui in the north to the Cape of Good Hope in the south) from the territory of the Archdiocese of Goa creating an separate ecclesiastical territory (prelature nullius) and named Torrado as the first Administrator of the Prelature of Mozambique. 
He never succeeded as Administrator of Mozambique as he died on 30 Dec 1612 in Goa.

References

External links and additional sources
  
  

17th-century Roman Catholic bishops in India
Bishops appointed by Pope Clement VIII
Bishops appointed by Pope Paul V
1612 deaths
1555 births
Augustinian bishops
People from Elvas